Joseph Coolidge (1798–1879), who married Thomas Jefferson's granddaughter Eleonora Wayles Randolph, was a partner of several trading companies, working most of his career overseas in the opium, silk, porcelain, and tea trades. He watched over his mother-in-law Martha Jefferson Randolph's interests and provided a home for her temporarily after Thomas Jefferson's death.

Early life
Born October 30, 1798, Joseph Coolidge was the son of Joseph and Elizabeth Bulfinch Coolidge. He is the third Joseph Coolidge representing the old Boston family. The family estate, now known as Coolidge House, was located at Bowdoin Square in the fashionable part of Boston. In 1817, Coolidge graduated from Harvard College (now Harvard University), along with classmates George Bancroft, Caleb Cushing, and Samuel A. Eliot. After graduation, he began a Grand Tour of Europe. He received his master's degree through an International Baccalaureate program in 1820. He was a friend of Lord Byron, who mentioned Coolidge in his journal in 1821. Coolidge returned to America in 1824.

Marriage and children

In early 1824, a letter was sent to Thomas Jefferson from George Ticknor, introducing Cooldige to Governor Thomas Mann Randolph, Martha Jefferson Randolph and their family. Coolidge visited Monticello in the spring of that year for two weeks, during which he met Ellen Wayles Randolph. They were married on May 27, 1825 at Monticello. After their honeymoon, they lived with Coolidge's parents at Bowdoin Square. They had two daughters and four sons:
 Ellen Randolph (1826–1894), who married Edmund Dwight
 Elizabeth Bulfinch (1827–1832)
 Joseph Randolph (1828–1925), who married Julia Gardner
 Algernon Sidney (1830–1912), a twin, who married Mary Lowell
 Philip Sidney (1830–1863), a twin, died during Civil War
 Thomas Jefferson (1831–1863), who married Hetty Sullivan Applegate

Jefferson family
After Thomas Jefferson died, and it was clear that Monticello would be sold, Coolidge's mother-in-law Martha Jefferson Randolph moved in with Joseph and Ellen Randolph Coolidge temporarily. Martha's youngest child, George Wythe Randolph, came with her to Boston. George remained with the Coolidges after Martha returned to Virginia in June 1827.

In January 1827, or earlier, Coolidge had recommended that Jefferson's manuscripts should be published with Jared Sparks' assistance. Coolidge "detested" his father-in-law Tom Randolph, and urged his mother-in-law not to reunite with him.

His wife Ellen began an extended visit to London in 1838. While Coolidge headed the Augustine Heard and Company in Canton, Ellen lived for two years in Macao. Women were unable to live in Canton. 

The Coolidges left China in 1844 for Switzerland where their sons attended a boarding school. One of the daughters lived in Boston, the other had died. The Coolidges lived in Europe for several years and then returned to Boston.

Career
Coolidge worked at three trading companies that operated in Asia, during which he made a fortune. He traded in opium, porcelain, silk, and tea in the 1830s and 1840s. 

After starting his career as a clerk, by 1834 he had become a working partner with Russell & Company, which was "probably the most important American seller" of Indian opium. About 1833, Coolidge was sent to Bombay and then Calcutta to increase the number of suppliers of opium. By the 1830s, Russell & Company had nearly all of the American trade in Chinese opium, but by 1833 lost its lead due to mismanagement. Coolidge was later removed from the organization due to a conflict with another partner, John Cleve Green. 

In 1839, Coolidge became an agent for the British firm Jardine, Matheson & Company in Canton. The following year, he was a co-founder of Augustine Heard & Company and was a resident partner. Augustine Heard & Company was an agent for Jardine, Matheson & Company. During the First Opium War, from 1839 to 1842, British merchants were banned from trading in China. Coolidge made profitable opium trades on behalf of the British during the war. Coolidge was overwhelmed with the influx of new business and asked Augustine Heard to sail to China to help manage the significant growth. Canton was attacked by the Chinese on May 21, 1841 with cannons and fireboats. Most Western merchants quickly fled the city, but Coolidge was working late. Picked up near the factory, he was believed to be a British businessman and was captured by a mob of angry Chinese. He spent two days in a Chinese prison and was saved by factory workers who declared that he was not British, but an American man. The factory was destroyed and Coolidge filed an excessively high claim for punitive and compensatory damages. Coolidge left the firm in spring 1844, following a disagreement with co-partner George Dixwell.

Death
His wife Ellen died April 30, 1876. Coolidge died on December 14, 1879 at his residence in Boston, Massachusetts.

See also
 Augustine Heard
 George W. Randolph
 Grandsons
 Archibald Cary Coolidge
 Harold Jefferson Coolidge Sr.
 John Gardner Coolidge
 Julian Coolidge
 Sally Cottrell Cole

Notes

References

Sources

Further reading
 

1798 births
1879 deaths
Harvard University alumni
People from Boston
International trade
People of the First Opium War
19th-century American businesspeople
Businesspeople from Boston